If We Ever Make It Home is Wade Bowen's third studio album. It was released in the fall of 2008. The album captures the emotion Bowen's wife's battle with post-partum depression. The song "Daddy and the Devil" features the vocals of singer/songwriter Chris Knight. The album's second single, "Trouble," is the second of Bowen's songs to have a music video, which was directed by Evan Kaufmann.

Track listing
"You Had Me At My Best" (Wade Bowen, Jedd Hughes) – 4:17
"If We Ever Make It Home" (Bowen, Jim Beavers) – 4:08
"Turn On The Lights" (Bowen, Stephony Smith) – 3:51
"Ghost In This Town" (Bowen, Michael Cox) – 3:56
"Why Makes Perfect Sense" (Bowen, Randy Rogers) – 5:15
"Trouble" (Bowen, Clint Ingersoll) – 4:01
"Nobody's Fool" (Bowen, Rogers) – 3:36
"Into The Arms Of You" (Sean McConnell) – 4:18
"From Bad To Good" (Bowen, Radney Foster) – 4:01
"Missing You" (Matt Powell) – 3:38
"Daddy And The Devil" (ft. Chris Knight) (Chuck Cannon, Chuck Jones, Tom Bukovac) – 3:44
"Somewhere Beautiful" (McConnell) – 5:04

Personnel
Drums - Shawn Fitcher
Bass guitar - David Santos
Electric Guitar - David Grissom, Jedd Hughes, Tom Bukovac, Kenny Greenberg, Greg V.
Acoustic Guitar - Ilya Toshinsky, Jedd Hughes, Tom Bukovac, Greg V.
Steel Guitar, Lap Steel Guitar - Dan Dugmore
Mandolin - Aubrey Haynie
Percussion - Eric Darken
Keyboards - Charlie Judge, Tim Lauer, J.R. Rodriguez
Piano, Accordion, B3 Organ - Charlie Judge
Pump Organ - Tim Lauer
Lead Vocals - Wade Bowen
Background Vocals - Jedd Hughes, Emily Francis, Sonya Isaacs, Ashley Monroe, Melodie Crittenden, Wes Hightower, Russell Terrell, J.R. Rodriguez
Guest Vocals - Chris Knight on "Daddy and the Devil"

Chart performance

References

Wade Bowen albums
2008 albums